The Kuwait Emir Cup is the premier cup competition involving teams from the Kuwaiti Premier League and the Kuwaiti Division One league.

The 2013 edition is the 50th to be held and has been moved back to its original place in the footballing calendar and played at the back end of the season.

Defending Emir Cup champions Al Qadsia and Kuwaiti Premier League runners up Al Kuwait received byes to the Quarter-Final round.

The winners qualify for the 2014 AFC Cup.

Round one

|}

Quarter finals

|}

Semi finals

|}

Final

|}

References

External links

soccerway.com

2013
2012–13 in Kuwaiti football
2012–13 domestic association football cups